Barnston West is a municipality within the Coaticook Regional County Municipality in Quebec, Canada, located on the Canada–United States border. It includes the hamlet of Ways Mills.

Demographics

Population
Population trend:

Language
Home language (2006)

References

External links

Municipalities in Quebec
Incorporated places in Estrie
Coaticook Regional County Municipality